Mayo is an Uto-Aztecan language. It is spoken by about 40,000 people, the Mexican Mayo or Yoreme Indians, who live in the South of the Mexican state of Sonora and in the North of the neighboring state of Sinaloa. Under the General Law of Linguistic Rights of the Indigenous Peoples" Law of Linguistic Rights, it is recognized as a "national language" along with 62 other indigenous languages and Spanish which all have the same validity in Mexico. The language is considered 'critically endangered' by UNESCO.

The Mayo language is partially intelligible with the Yaqui language, and the division between the two languages is more political, from the historic division between the Yaqui and the Mayo peoples, than linguistic.

Programming in both Mayo and Yaqui is carried by the CDI's radio station XEETCH, broadcasting from Etchojoa, Sonora.

Phonology

Consonants

Vowels

Morphology
Mayo is an agglutinative language, where words use suffix complexes for a variety of purposes with several morphemes strung together.

External links
Nominal and Adjectival Predication in Yoreme/Mayo of Sonora and Sinaloa

References

Sources
Collard, Howard and Collard, Elisabeth Scott. 1962. Vocabulario Mayo, Vocabularios Indigenas Marianno Silva y Aceves. Num. 6. 
Aguilar Zeleny, Alejandro S. 1995. "Los mayos," In Etnografía contemporánea de los pueblos indígenas de México. México: Región Noroeste Instituto Nacional Indigenista.
Acosta, Roberto. 1983. Apuntes históricos sonorenses: la conquista temporal y espiritual del Yaqui y del Mayo Imprenta Aldina. Mèxico (1a. ediciòn). México: Gobierno del Estado de Sonora.
 Hagberg, Larry. 1989. "Stress and Length in Mayo." In Shipley, William, (ed.). In Honor of Mary Haas: From the Haas Festival Conference on Native Essays in Honor to Mary Hass. Halle: Mouton.
Lionnet, Andres S.J. 1977. Los elementos de la lengua cahita (yaqui-mayo) México: Universidad Nacional Autónoma de México. 
Spicer, Edward Holland. 1969. "The Yaqui and the Mayo." In Wauchope, R., editor. Handbook of Middle American Indians, Vol 8. Austin: University of Texas Press.
Hagberg, Larry and Zamarrón, José Luis Moctezuma. 2001. "Investigaciones sobre la lengua mayo." In Zamarrón, José Luis Moctezuma and Hill, Jane H. (eds), Avances y balances de lenguas yutoaztecas; homenaje a Wick R. Miller p. 195–206. Serie Lingüística. Mexico, D.F.: Instituto Nacional de Antropología y Historia.

Agglutinative languages
Mayo people
Southern Uto-Aztecan languages
Indigenous languages of Mexico
Indigenous languages of the North American Southwest
Subject–object–verb languages